The Honourable George Augustus Frederick Lake  (1781-1808) was a British Army Commanding Infantry Officer who Commanded His Majesty's 29th Regiment of Foot during the early stages Peninsular War.

George Lake's family were well-connected at court, and in 1790 he was appointed one of the Prince of Wales' Pages of Honour.

George Lake's father was General Gerard Lake who became Viscount Lake of Delhi and Laswary and Aston Clint after his service in India. George Lake served with his father as his aide-de-camp and military secretary from 1798 to 1803 in both Ireland and India. As a Major in the 94th Regiment of Foot he was seriously wounded at the Battle of Laswaree, whilst ensuring his father remounted after General Lake had his horse shot from under him.

In early 1808 Lieutenant Colonel Lake embarked with his regiment and travelling via Gibraltar, landed in the Iberian Peninsula in June 1808. One of the regiment's officers claimed that they were one of the first British units to do so.

In regimental muster returns for August and September 1808 it is recorded that Lake was killed in one of the early engagements with the French in the Peninsular War, at the Battle of Roliça on 17 August 1808. According to various accounts Lake was leading his Grenadier Company into a mountain pass when they were fired on by French infantry from well-prepared positions and he was killed; although his unit succeeded in overcoming the enemy defences. He was buried by his men after the battle (as was the habit of the time) close to the spot where he died (the grave site is marked with a cross); there is also a memorial plaque in Westminster Abbey commemorating his death. The monument is sculpted by James Smith.

His father had predeceased him by six months having died shortly after his son's regiment had sailed for Gibraltar.

References

29th Regiment of Foot officers
British Army personnel of the Peninsular War
Younger sons of viscounts
1781 births
1808 deaths
British military personnel killed in action in the Napoleonic Wars